Jefferson Smith may refer to:
 Soapy Smith (Jefferson Randolph Smith II, 1860–1898), American con artist and gangster
 Jefferson Smith (politician) (born 1973), member of the Oregon House of Representatives and the founder of the Bus Project
 Jefferson Smith, the main character in the 1939 film Mr. Smith Goes to Washington, portrayed by James Stewart

See also
Jeff Smith (disambiguation)